Muran (also Romanized as Mūrān; also known as Mūzān) is a village in Muran Rural District, in the Soveyseh District of Karun County, Khuzestan Province, Iran. At the 2006 census, its population was 865, in 153 families.

References 

Populated places in Karun County